SS Cedarville was a bulk carrier that carried limestone on the Great Lakes in the mid-20th century until it sank after a collision with another ship,  May 7 1965

Service history

Cedarville was built in 1927 by the Great Lakes Engineering Works in River Rouge, Michigan. The ship was launched as SS A.F. Harvey, and entered service for the Pittsburgh Steamship Company division of US Steel. In 1956, the ship was transferred to the Bradley Transportation Company, still owned by US Steel. As part of the transfer, the ship was converted to be a self-unloading vessel and was renamed Cedarville.

Sinking
The collision occurred as a result of miscommunication between the two ships, which both changed their course a mile away from each other, with Topdalsfjords captain steering his ship on a course that would lead to the two vessels passing each other on their starboard sides. The captain of Cedarville, however, intended for his vessel to cross the bow of Topdalsfjord, but his message stating such was not received by Topdalsfjord, which continued on a course that led to it colliding with Cedarvilles port side.

While the collision caused only superficial damage above the waterline, consisting mainly of broken railings and deck plates, the bow of Topdalsfjord had created a large hole in Cedarvilles hull below the waterline, and within minutes of the collision a slight list to the port had developed. The captain of Cedarville ordered water to be pumped into the starboard ballast tanks to counteract the list, and intended to try to run the ship aground to prevent it from sinking.  As the ship moved towards land, however, the weight of the water within the hull forced the bow down, and the ship began listing to starboard, eventually rolling over before sinking.  Most survivors of the collision, in which ten out of the 35 aboard died, were picked up by the German freighter MV Weissenburg, and subsequently transferred to the US Coast Guard cutter Mackinaw.

Inquiry into sinking
A U.S. Coast Guard inquiry into the incident found that the captain of Cedarville was at fault for the sinking and was charged with four counts of faulty seamanship. He initially pleaded innocent, but in August 1965 changed his plea to guilty.  His license was suspended for a year as a result of the inquiry.

Wreck site
Expert divers are able to enter the ship, as most parts remain fairly undamaged.
Cedarville is the fourth largest ship lost on the Great Lakes after ,  and fleet mate .

References

Great Lakes freighters
Shipwrecks of Lake Huron
Ships sunk in collisions
Maritime incidents in 1965
1927 ships
Ships built in River Rouge, Michigan